Boyhood's End is a cantata for tenor and piano composed by Michael Tippett in 1943, based on text by William Henry Hudson. Tippett wrote the piece for Peter Pears and Benjamin Britten, whose talent had impressed him during a rehearsal for My Beloved Spake. Pears and Britten performed Boyhood's End in June 1943 at Morley College; it was given its premiere, perhaps by someone else, on May 24 that year.

References

External links
 Boyhood's End at The Lied, Art Song, and Choral Texts Archive

1943 compositions
Compositions by Michael Tippett
Cantatas